Phil the Alien is a 2004 Canadian comedy film. It was written and directed by Rob Stefaniuk, who also starred as the titular Phil.

The film's cast also includes Graham Greene and Ingrid Veninger.

Plot summary
Phil is an extraterrestrial with shape-shifting ability and telekinetic powers. After crash-landing in Northern Ontario, Phil befriends a red neck child, his father, and a talking beaver as he wanders the Canadian wilderness. Phil is soon introduced to the trappings of small town northern Ontario and adopts the persona and mannerisms of a stereotypical Canadian small town alcoholic while hiding from the ineffectual and mentally traumatized military general who is trying to capture him. Hilarity ensues as his telekinetic powers convince some that he is the Christian messiah and soon joins a local rock band as a singer. A cold hearted assassin from Quebec attempts to end his existence as he and the band go out on tour.  The ending consists of suspense, treachery, and dolphins.

Cast
 Rob Stefaniuk ... Phil the Alien
 Nicole de Boer ... Madame Madame
 Graham Greene ... Wolf
 Boyd Banks ... Slim
 Christopher Barry ... Thomas

References

External links
 

2004 comedy films
2004 films
2000s comedy road movies
2000s science fiction comedy films
Alien visitations in films
Canadian comedy road movies
Canadian science fiction comedy films
Films about shapeshifting
Films about telekinesis
Films set in Northern Ontario
French-language Canadian films
2000s English-language films
2000s Canadian films